Denver Clayton Lemaster (born February 25, 1939) is a retired American professional baseball baseball player and left-handed pitcher who appeared in 357 games over 11 seasons (1962–1972) for the Milwaukee / Atlanta Braves, Houston Astros and Montreal Expos. A one-time National League All-Star, Lemaster won 90 games over the course of his MLB career.

Career
Lemaster was born in Corona, California, and signed a $70,000 bonus contract with the Braves upon graduation from Oxnard High School. He rose through the team's farm system over the next 4 years before making his major league debut as the Braves' starting pitcher on July 15, 1962, against the defending league champion Cincinnati Reds at Milwaukee County Stadium. He held a 2–1 lead going into the ninth inning, but a Vada Pinson home run, followed by an unearned run, saddled him with a 3–2, complete game defeat. 

In , Lemaster became a regular member of the Braves' starting rotation, and exceeded 200 innings pitched three times in the next five seasons. He won 17 games in 1964 (losing 11), threw two one-hitters (in 1964 and 1967), set a team record of 14 strikeouts in one 1966 game, and was selected to the 1967 NL All-Star team during his final season with the club. He did not appear in the game, played at Anaheim Stadium on July 11 and won by the Senior Circuit 2–1 in 15 innings. Traded to Houston that off-season, Lemaster again exceeded 200 innings pitched in his first two campaigns as an Astro and posted a solid 3.00 composite earned run average, but won only 23 of 55 decisions.

All told, Lemaster posted a 90–105 win–loss record and a 3.58 career earned run average during his MLB tenure. In 249 games started, he registered 66 complete games and 14 shutouts, adding eight saves as a relief pitcher. In 1,782 innings pitched, he allowed 1,703 hits and 600 bases on balls with 1,305 strikeouts.

References

External links

1939 births
Living people
American expatriate baseball players in Canada
Atlanta Braves players
Austin Senators players
Baseball players from California
Eau Claire Braves players
Houston Astros players
Jacksonville Braves players
Louisville Colonels (minor league) players
Major League Baseball pitchers
Milwaukee Braves players
Montreal Expos players
People from Corona, California
Sportspeople from Oxnard, California
Vancouver Mounties players